= Renewable Energy Act, 2011 =

Act of the Parliament of Ghana

The Renewable Energy Act, 2011 (Act 832) is a law enacted by the Parliament of Ghana to provide a legal framework for the development, management, utilization, and sustainability of renewable energy sources in the country. It was assented to by the late former President His excellency John Evans Fiifi Atta Mills on 31 December 2011 and commenced on the same date. The Act aims to promote the use of renewable energy to generate heat and power in an efficient and environmentally sustainable manner.

== Objectives ==
The primary objective of the Act is to support the development and utilization of renewable energy sources through a regulatory framework that attracts investment and fosters an enabling environment. It also seeks to diversify Ghana's energy supply to safeguard energy security, improve access to electricity, build indigenous capacity in renewable energy technologies, and enhance public education on renewable energy production and utilization. The Act additionally regulates the production and supply of woodfuel and bio-fuel.

== Definition of renewable energy ==
Under the act, renewable energy refers to energy obtained from non-depleting sources, which include wind, solar, hydro, biomass, bio-fuel, landfill gas, sewage gas, geothermal energy, ocean energy, and other sources designated in writing by the Minister responsible.

== Institutional responsibilities ==
The Act assigns specific roles to various government bodies:

- Ministerial Role: The Minister responsible for energy is tasked with providing policy direction to achieve the objectives of the Act.
- Energy Commission: This is the regulatory body responsible for overseeing renewable energy planning, project licensing, tariff regulation, quality assurance, monitoring, reporting, promotion, and awareness. The Commission advises the Minister on renewable energy matters, facilitates collaboration among government, private sector, and civil society, recommends educational programs to mainstream renewable energy, and suggests duty exemptions for equipment necessary for renewable energy development.
- Public Utilities Regulatory Commission (PURC): Oversees tariff approval and regulation relevant to the renewable energy sector.
- Public Utilities: Licensed utilities involved in electricity transmission, distribution, or sale are required to comply with the Act and contribute to meeting its objectives.

== Licensing and regulatory provisions ==
The Act outlines procedures for licensing renewable energy projects, including the criteria for application, grant, renewal, modification, suspension, or cancellation of licenses. It establishes conditions for licenses related to production, supply, storage, marketing, installation, maintenance, and transportation of renewable energy resources.

=== Support Mechanisms ===
To promote the adoption of renewable energy, the Act includes provisions for a feed-in-tariff scheme, renewable energy purchase obligations for utilities, and tariff rates to incentivize investment and generation of renewable electricity.

=== Amendments ===
The Renewable Energy Act, 2011 has been amended, notably by the Renewable Energy (Amendment) Act, 2020 (Act 1045), which updated and expanded certain provisions to strengthen the regulatory environment and encourage increased renewable energy investment and deployment in Ghana.
